Calliostoma heugteni is a species of sea snail, a marine gastropod mollusk in the family Calliostomatidae.

Description

Distribution
This species occurs in the Atlantic Ocean, south of the Azores, off the Great Meteor Seamount.

References

 Vilvens C. & Swinnen F., 2003: Description of Calliostoma heutgeni n. sp. (Gastropoda: Trochidae: Calliostomatidae); Novapex 4(4): 119-123

External links

heugteni
Gastropods described in 2003